Hypericum densiflorum, also known as bushy St. John's wort or dense St. John's wort, is a perennial herb in the flowering plant family Hypericaceae native to North America. The specific epithet densiflorum is Latin, meaning "densely flowered", referring to the many-flowered cymes.

Description
The many slender branches are slightly angled and branchlets are two-edged. The capsules vary in shape from lanceolate to slenderly conic, with three carpels and three styles.

The plant flowers from July to September and fruits from early October to the end of autumn.

Habitat and distribution
Hypericum densiflorum occurs on acidic soils in moist and wet conditions, including stream, pond, and lake banks, seepage slopes, and wet meadows.

The shrub occurs throughout the eastern and southern United States though it grows far west as Texas and as far north as New York.

Ecology 
H. densiflorum has been marked as a pollinator plant, supporting and attracting bees.

References

Plants described in 1813
densiflorum
Taxa named by Frederick Traugott Pursh